Akshayuk Pass formerly Pangnirtung Pass is a mountain pass in the Baffin Mountains of Nunavut, Canada. It is found within Auyuittuq National Park.

Geography
Akshayuk Pass is located in Baffin Island's Cumberland Peninsula. Summit Lake is the highest point on the pass.

Akshayuk Pass is an ancient riverbed that has eroded to its present size and shape providing a travel route through, and drainage for, glaciers that spill into the river valleys below.

References

Arctic Cordillera
Mountain passes of Baffin Island